This article lists the confirmed national football squads for the 2007 AFC Asian Cup tournament jointly held in Malaysia, Indonesia, Thailand and Vietnam between 7 July and 29 July 2007.

Before announcing their final squad, several teams named a provisional squad of 23 to 30 players, but each country's final squad of 23 players had to be submitted by 16 June 2007. Replacement of injured players was permitted until 24 hours before the team's first Asian Cup game. Players marked (c) were named as captain for their national squad. Number of caps counts until the start of the tournament, including all pre-tournament friendlies.

Group A

Thailand 
Head coach:  Charnwit Polcheewin

Iraq 
Head coach:  Jorvan Vieira

Australia 
Head coach:  Graham Arnold

Oman 
Head coach:  Gabriel Calderón

Group B

Vietnam 
Head coach:  Alfred Riedl

United Arab Emirates 
Head coach:  Bruno Metsu

Japan 
Head coach:  Ivica Osim

* Replaced Ryūji Bando who pulled out with injury.

Qatar 
Head coach:  Džemaludin Mušović

Group C

Malaysia 
Head coach:  Norizan Bakar

China 
Head coach:  Zhu Guanghu

Iran 
Head coach:  Amir Ghalenoei

Uzbekistan 
Head coach:  Rauf Inileev

* Replaced Asror Aliqulov who pulled out with injury.

Group D

Indonesia 
Head coach:  Ivan Kolev

Bahrain 
Head coach:  Milan Máčala

South Korea 
Head coach:  Pim Verbeek

Saudi Arabia 
Head coach:  Hélio dos Anjos

Player representation 

Clubs represented by five or more players

By club nationality

By club Federation

By representatives of domestic league

References

AFC Asian Cup squads